The Sixth Sense is an American paranormal thriller television series featuring Gary Collins and Catherine Ferrar. The series was produced by and filmed at Universal Studios, and broadcast by ABC from January 15 to December 23, 1972.

Development

The Sixth Sense series was based on the 1971 television movie Sweet, Sweet Rachel. That opened with a photo of UCLA's Royce Hall—implying UCLA is where Dr. Darrow is a parapsychology researcher—and with a quote: "'If I had my life to live over, I should devote myself to psychic research rather than psychoanalysis.' — Sigmund Freud."

Its cast included Alex Dreier as Dr. Lucas Darrow (former surgeon and parapsychology researcher), Pat Hingle as Arthur Piper, Louise Latham as Lillian Piper, Steve Ihnat as Dr. Simon Tyler (Psychologist), Brenda Scott as Nora Piper, Chris Robinson as Carey Johnson (Dr. Darrow's blind research assistant), Stefanie Powers as Mrs. Rachel Stanton, Rod McCarey as Paul Stanton, Richard Bull as Lt. Fisher, Mark Tapscott as Henry, John Hillerman as Medical Examiner, William Bryant as Doctor and John Alvin as Surgeon. It was produced by Stan Shpetner, written by Anthony Lawrence and directed by Sutton Roley with music by Laurence Rosenthal. It was filmed at Samuel Goldwyn Studios.

Synopsis

Dr. Michael Rhodes (Collins), a professor of parapsychology who has ESP, and his assistant Nancy Murphy (Ferrar) attempt to solve supernatural crimes and mysteries.

Production
The series, which was broadcast Saturday nights at 10 pm, had tough competition from CBS's Mission: Impossible and NBC's Saturday Night at the Movies. Despite mediocre ratings, The Sixth Sense was renewed for a second season, mainly due to its well-known guest stars. Ratings continued to decline, and ABC canceled The Sixth Sense on November 14, 1972, broadcasting the remaining episodes through December 1972.

Notable among its many guest stars were Joan Crawford, Sandra Dee, Patty Duke, Cloris Leachman, Carol Lynley, Lee Majors, William Shatner, Jane Wyman and Jim Davis.

Syndication 
For its syndication release, The Sixth Sense was edited and included with Night Gallery hosted by Rod Serling. As The Sixth Sense was an hour-long show, and the syndicated version of Night Gallery was a half-hour show, the episodes were edited quite severely. Serling's newly added introductions usually covered the introductory scenes and plot point set-ups that had been removed.

Home media
The complete TV series was released in France in October 2014 by Elephant Films. The set is composed of 9 discs with selectable soundtracks in French and English. Though produced in PAL format, it is playable in all regions.

Episodes 

The Sixth Sense ran for two seasons starting in 1972, including the television film from October 2, 1971. Each first season episode opened with the quote: "Your sons and daughters will prophesy, Your old men will dream dreams, Your young men will see visions." Old Testament Joel 2:28.

Season 1: 1972 
The show premiered on January 15, 1972, with the episode "I Do Not Belong to the Human World".

Season 2: 1972 
The second season of The Sixth Sense started on September 23, 1972, with the episode Coffin, Coffin, in the Sky and had 12 episodes in the season.

Paperback tie-in fiction
Two books based on the series were released by Tempo Books. Uniquely, book #1, Witch, Witch Burning Bright by John W. Bloch (1972), published while first run episodes were still airing, was neither an original novel nor an episode novelization, but rather a simple reproduction of his teleplay for the eighth episode of the series (see above). Idiosyncratically, that precedent was abandoned with book #2, In the Steps of the Master by then-up-and-coming fantasist Marion Zimmer Bradley (1973), which was a more traditional original TV tie-in novel utilizing the show's characters and concepts, published shortly after the show's cancellation.

See also
 Daughter of the Mind (1969 ABC "Movie of the Week")

References

External links 

Television shows about psychic powers
American Broadcasting Company original programming
Television series by Universal Television
1970s American drama television series
Occult detective fiction
English-language television shows
American thriller television series
1972 American television series debuts
1972 American television series endings